Akbar-ur-Rehman (born 14 September 1983, Karachi) is an international cricketer from Pakistan. He was part of the bronze medal-winning team at the 2010 Asian Games in Guangzhou, China.

Career
In November 2010, Rehman was part of the team at the Asian Games in Guangzhou, China which won a bronze medal by beating Sri Lanka in the 3rd place playoffs.

In April 2018, he was named in Balochistan's squad for the 2018 Pakistan Cup. In January 2021, he was named in Balochistan's squad for the 2020–21 Pakistan Cup.

References

External links
 

1983 births
Living people
Pakistani cricketers
Cricketers at the 2010 Asian Games
Asian Games bronze medalists for Pakistan
Asian Games medalists in cricket
Cricketers from Karachi
Karachi Blues cricketers
National Bank of Pakistan cricketers
Karachi Zebras cricketers
Karachi Whites cricketers
Karachi Dolphins cricketers
Quetta Gladiators cricketers
Baluchistan cricketers
Medalists at the 2010 Asian Games
Sindh cricketers